Adnan Ghaus (born 27 November 1990) is a Pakistani first-class cricketer who plays for Sui Southern Gas Company. He made his Twenty20 debut for Rawalpindi in the 2017–18 National T20 Cup on 21 November 2017.

References

External links
 

1990 births
Living people
Pakistani cricketers
Rawalpindi cricketers
Sui Southern Gas Company cricketers
Federally Administered Tribal Areas cricketers
Place of birth missing (living people)
Staffordshire cricketers